Jacob Binckes (1637, Koudum – 12 December 1677) was a Dutch commodore. Jacob himself used the name Benckes.

Jacob was seafarer trading mostly on Norway in the transport of wood.

In 1665 Jacob Binckes started his service with the Admiralty of Amsterdam. His first assignment as a captain was to escort a convoy to Norway. The next year, he helped to secure the River Elbe in northern Germany, near Glückstadt, in the interest of Dutch merchant shipping.

As a captain he was part of the first of two Dutch invasions of England in 1667 in the Raid on the Medway in the Second Anglo-Dutch War. With his fregat Essen (including 25 marines) Jacob Binckes is part of the strike force on the Medway.

In 1673 together with captain Cornelis Evertsen de Jongste (Keesje the Devil) he re-captured the former New Netherland capitol New Amsterdam, which had been renamed New York after it had surrendered in 1664. In 1674, New York was returned to the English by William III of Orange-Nassau (who later King of England) as part of the Treaty of Westminster (1674).

IN 1675 Jacob Binckes is commodore of a fleet to support the King of Denmark in its war with the Kingdom of Sweden.

In 1677 as a commodore on his flagship the Beschermer he defeated the French fleet in the First Battle at Tobago February that year, but he was killed in action in the Second Battle of Tobago in the Franco-Dutch War December the same year. During the second attack a mortar hit the powder storage inside the fort and killed Jacob Binckes and many others.

The person Jacob Binckes and the second battle at Tobago served as basis for the character Robinson Crusoe written by Daniel Defoe.

References

1637 births
1677 deaths
Dutch naval personnel of the Anglo-Dutch Wars
People from Nijefurd
People of New Netherland